Seymour Eugene Gourley,  (December 20, 1854 – January 5, 1906) was a lawyer and political figure in Nova Scotia, Canada. He represented Colchester in the House of Commons of Canada from 1900 to 1904 as a Conservative.

He was born in Brookfield, Nova Scotia, the son of Elisha C. Gourley and Mary Black, and was educated in Brookfield, in Truro, at the Horton Academy and Acadia College. He was admitted to the bar in 1874 and set up practice in Truro. In 1891, Gourley married H. Rose McLellan. He was named a Queen's Counsel in the same year.

References 

Members of the House of Commons of Canada from Nova Scotia
Conservative Party of Canada (1867–1942) MPs
1854 births
1906 deaths
Canadian King's Counsel